The "Monsters of Ecatepec" is the name given to a serial killing couple Juan Carlos Hernández (1985, Lázaro Cárdenas, Michoacán) and Patricia Martínez (1980, Lázaro Cárdenas, Michoacán). The case also received the names of "The House of Horror" or "The Butchers of Ecatepec". Active in Ecatepec de Morelos, State of Mexico, from 2012 to 2018, the pair are suspected to have committed between 10 and 20 murders, and have also confessed to cannibalizing the bodies of their victims . The pair were apprehended on October 4, 2018 when transporting human remains in a baby stroller.

Background 
They were both born in Lázaro Cárdenas, Michoacán, within a five-year age gap. Juan Carlos' mother was a single mother, who allegedly often dressed him as a girl, brought men to her house and forced her son to watch her sexual encounters. Also, he declared that in his childhood, he suffered sexual abuse by another woman who at the time was his caretaker. When he was 10 years old, he fell from the stairs and suffered a severe traumatic brain injury. Patricia Martínez was born to a poor family, and was manipulative. She was diagnosed with a border intelligence disorder linked to intellectual disability. She was a prostitute at the time.

The couple met in 2008, when Patricia worked as waitress at a restaurant, of which Juan Carlos was a regular client. They initiated a relationship and, although he bragged to be an "assassin", she decided to move with him. The couple had four children during their 10-year relationship. They opened a family business where they sold clothing, perfume and cell phones.

Crimes 
Their first victim, according to Patricia's declaration, was a 22-year-old woman who Juan Carlos lured with job promises. In their house, Hernández led her to their bathroom where he raped, beheaded and dismembered her. Martínez kept their children outside the house while the murder occurred. After the murder, Martínez partially cooked the body and ate it with her husband. Their second victim was a teen girl who lived next to them, who suffered an inhalants addiction; they allegedly lured her with promises of wealth. Like the first victim she was also raped, beheaded and dismembered in their bathroom. Patricia cooked the victim's body in oil and salt.

References 

Criminal duos
Ecatepec de Morelos
Fugitives
Living people
Male serial killers
Mexican cannibals
Mexican female serial killers
Mexican people convicted of kidnapping
Mexican people convicted of murder
Mexican rapists
Mexican serial killers
Year of birth missing (living people)